Twin Peaks is a double summit, in Sequoia National Park, California, United States.



Composition
Twin Peaks consist of exfoliating granite.

The area
Twin Peaks stand quite near Silliman Pass, Mount Silliman and Twin Lakes. The Kings-Kaweah Divide crosses through both summits.

The climb
They are best climbed from Lodgepole, and the  hike via Silliman Pass is about  round trip.  It is also possible to climb them, from Twin Lakes.

References

External links
 On hiking Twin Peaks, with nice photos
 More on the hike
 More on climbing Twin Peaks
 One map
 A Youtube

 
Sierra Nevada (United States)